Embasaurus (meaning "Emba lizard") is a genus of theropod dinosaur from the Early Cretaceous period. It is known from two vertebrae found in the Neocomian Sands of Kazakhstan. As it is known only from fragmentary remains, Embasaurus is considered by some to be a possible nomen dubium. It was named after the Emba River, and it is believed to have lived during the Berriasian stage, around 140 million years ago. According to the Theropod Database, a personal website designed by Mickey Mortimer, further research may suggest that Embasaurus may be a basal tyrannosauroid. George Olshevsky, however, considered Embasaurus to be a megalosaurid, closely related to Magnosaurus, Megalosaurus, and Torvosaurus.

The type species, Embasaurus minax, was described by the Soviet paleontologist Anatoly Riabinin in 1931.

References 

Prehistoric theropods
Berriasian life
Early Cretaceous dinosaurs of Asia
Cretaceous Kazakhstan
Fossils of Kazakhstan
Fossil taxa described in 1931
Nomina dubia